Russinho is a nickname. Notable people with the name include:

Russinho (footballer, 1902-1992), full name Moacyr Siqueira de Queiroz, Brazilian football midfielder
Russinho (footballer, 1917-1958), full name David Russowski, Brazilian football forward